Jugulator is the thirteenth studio album by English heavy metal band Judas Priest. It was released in Japan on 16 October 1997 and the rest of the world on 28 October 1997. It was their first studio album since Painkiller in 1990 and the first of two studio albums the band recorded without Rob Halford and with American lead vocalist Tim "Ripper" Owens. Jugulator is the only Judas Priest album that has never been released on any major digital media website, due to SPV falling under and going bankrupt around 2009.

Lyrical content
The lyrics dealt with darker themes than previous releases, including the eponymous mechanized demon which disembowels its prey, and the end of the world in the song "Cathedral Spires." The guitars were also tuned down as low as C# and C, making a shift from the speed metal and traditional heavy metal elements of Painkiller to a more thrash metal-oriented sound.

"Brain Dead" is written from the perspective of a man who, after a tragedy, has lost the ability to move and speak and is therefore trapped in his mind, having been placed on life support. The footnote in the CD booklet for this song reads "We all have sympathy for those left to care and despair for victims of tragedy but what of the victim himself—trapped inside his body a coffin—unable to move a muscle or blink an eye but aware of the living hell he's enduring and unable to bring it to an end—a man not even a shadow of his former self—a man who wants to be remembered for what he was—not forgotten because of what he has become."

Reaction
Reaction to the album was divided among those who enjoyed it on its own terms, those who liked the music but would prefer if Halford had sung it, and those who disliked it on all counts. Glenn Tipton defended the musical changes: "You must remember that two albums went missing between 1990 and Jugulator. To us, it's not the huge leap some people see it as." Tim "Ripper" Owens opines that Jugulator is a better album than 2008's Nostradamus.

"Some people felt there wasn't enough melody on Jugulator," remarked Tipton, "but we just weren't feeling very melodic at the time."

In 2018, Owens pledged to re-record this album and its follow-up Demolition as he feels that his era of the band has "been erased". Ever since Rob Halford rejoined the band, songs from both albums have been left off the band's concert setlists, although Halford stated that he wouldn't mind performing the songs live.

Promotion
A music video was shot for the song "Burn in Hell", though over two minutes of the song was removed in the final video. "Jugulator" and "Blood Stained" were also included on Judas Priest's box set Metalogy.

Awards and nominations
"Bullet Train" was nominated for a Grammy Award for Best Metal Performance in 1999.

Track listing

Personnel
Judas Priest
Tim "Ripper" Owens – vocals
K. K. Downing – guitars
Glenn Tipton – guitars
Ian Hill – bass
Scott Travis – drums

Production
 Glenn Tipton – producer
 K. K. Downing – producer
 Sean Lynch – producer
 Recorded and mixed at Silvermere Studios
 Mastered at Whitfield Street Studios
 Mark Wilkinson – cover illustration
 Andie Airfix at Satori – design
 Ross Halfin – photography

Charts

References

1997 albums
Judas Priest albums
SPV/Steamhammer albums
Concept albums
Groove metal albums
Thrash metal albums by British artists